Song of Songs 8 (abbreviated  as Song 8) is the eighth (and the final) chapter of the Song of Songs in the Hebrew Bible or the Old Testament of the Christian Bible. This book is one of the Five Megillot, a collection of short books, together with Ruth, Lamentations, Ecclesiastes and Esther, within the Ketuvim, the third and the last part of the Hebrew Bible. Jewish tradition views Solomon as the author of this book (although this is now largely disputed), and this attribution influences the acceptance of this book as a canonical text.

This chapter contains dialogues between the woman and the daughters of Jerusalem, the woman and her brothers, then finally, the woman and the man, the "bride" and the "bridegroom".

Text
The original text is written in Hebrew language. This chapter is divided into 14 verses.

Textual witnesses
Some early manuscripts containing the text of this chapter in Hebrew are of the Masoretic Text, which includes the Codex Leningradensis (1008).

There is also a translation into Koine Greek known as the Septuagint, made in the last few centuries BCE. Extant ancient manuscripts of the Septuagint version include Codex Vaticanus (B; B; 4th century), Codex Sinaiticus (S; BHK: S; 4th century), and Codex Alexandrinus (A; A; 5th century).

Structure
The Modern English Version (MEV) identifies the speakers in this chapter as:
 = The Woman (continuing from Song of Songs 7:10-13)
a =  Friends of the Woman
 = The Woman
 = Brothers of the Woman
 = The Woman
 = The Man
 = The Woman
Kugler and Hartin treat verses 5 onwards as an appendix. The Jerusalem Bible treats verse 7b onwards (from Were a man to offer all the wealth of his house to buy love ...) as "appendices".

Female: Springtime and love (8:1–4)
This female passage is the last part of a long section concerning the desire and love in the country which runs from chapter 6 until verse 4 here. It consists  probably or possibly of more than a single song, describing the woman's wish that her lover to be her brother, so that they can be together in her 'mother's house' (verses 1–2; cf. ); they embrace (verse 3; cf. ) and another appeal to the daughters of Jerusalem (verse 4).

Verse 1
Oh, that you were like my brother,
Who nursed at my mother’s breasts!
If I should find you outside,
I would kiss you;
I would not be despised.
For "like my brother", or "as my brother" in the King James Version, the International Standard Version notes that the Hebrew text lacks the preposition "like". Andrew Harper argues that the word 'as' "should probably be omitted, as the accidental repetition of the last letter of the preceding word".

Verse 4
I charge you, O daughters of Jerusalem,
do not stir up or awaken love
until it pleases.
Cross references: Song of Songs 2:7; 3:5.
"Charge" or "adjure"
The names of God are apparently substituted with similar sounding phrases depicting 'female gazelles' for [God of] hosts, and 'does of the field'/'wild does/female deer' (ha-) for God Almighty.

Chorus: Search for the couple (8:5a)
Verse 5 opens the last section or epilogue of the book, speaking about the power of love which continues to verse 14 (the end of the book).

Verse 5
[Friends of the Woman]
Who is that coming up from the wilderness,
leaning upon her beloved?
[The Woman]
Under the apple tree I awakened you.
There your mother was in labor with you;
there she who bore you was in labor.

Female: The power of love (8:5b-7)
There are two fragments of the female voice in this part (verse 5; cf.) and verses 6-7 containing her declaration of love which 'might have constituted a suitable end for the whole book'.

Verse 6
Set me as a seal upon your heart,
as a seal upon your arm;
for love is strong as death,
passion fierce as the grave.
Its fires of desire are as ardent flames,
a most intense flame.
"Fierce": "cruel" (in KJV and NKJV), "severe", lit. "hard". from Hebrew: , .
"The grave": or "Sheol".
"A most intense flame": lit. "a flame of Yah", poetic form of "YHWH", "the Lord". from Hebrew: , .

Brothers: Their younger sister (8:8-9)
These two verses form a part describing how the woman's maternal brothers decide to keep their sister's virginity, when necessary.  However, they do that in disparaging way, which recalls their maligning attitude in chapter 1.

Female: Her defense; Solomon's vineyard (8:10–12)
As a response, the woman answers her brothers mockingly. When in Song 1:5–6 she "ineffectually complained" about her brothers' antagonism towards her, here she can stand up for herself and has found her peace.

Verse 12

My vineyard, my very own, is before me;
you, O Solomon, may have the thousand,
and the keepers of the fruit two hundred.
"My vineyard": the emphatic Hebrew expression , kar-mî (from kerem for "vineyard"), as the first word of this verse, is to provide contrast to Solomon’s large possession and yet beyond his reach.

Male: Listening (8:13)
No doubt that this part contains the words of the man addressing the bride that 'it is delightful to him to hear her voice'.

Verse 13
You who dwell in the gardens,
The companions listen for your voice—
Let me hear it!
The man (or the bridegroom) calls upon his bride (the Shulammite) to let his companions, that is 'his friends who may have come to congratulate him on his bride's safe return', hear her voice.

In the community of Sephardic and Oriental Jews, the congregation in traditional synagogues goes back and recites verse 13 after reciting verse 14 to avoid ending a reading in a negative note.

Female: Departure (8:14)
The very last verse: the woman's voice calls to her male lover to run, like a gazelle or deer, to “the distant nevernever land of the perfume hills”. With that, ‘the love's game can begin afresh, suspended in timelessness and moving cyclically’.

Verse 14
Make haste, my beloved,
and be like a gazelle or a young stag
on the mountains of spices!
"Make haste": "hurry", lit.

See also
Gazelle
Jerusalem
Vineyard
Related Bible parts: Song of Songs 1, Song of Songs 7

Notes

References

Sources

External links
 Jewish translations:
 Shir Hashirim - Song of Songs - Chapter 8 (Judaica Press) translation [with Rashi's commentary] at Chabad.org
 Christian translations:
 Online Bible at GospelHall.org (ESV, KJV, Darby, American Standard Version, Bible in Basic English)
 Song of Solomon Chapter 8 King James Version
  Various versions

08